Events in the year 1707 in Norway.

Incumbents
Monarch: Frederick IV

Events

Arts and literature
 The Velthen Company becomes the perhaps first professional theater company to perform in Norway.

Births

Deaths
Petter Dass, priest and poet and hymn writer (born 1647).

See also

References